The Sun Ship Game is a 1971 documentary film about competition soaring in the United States. Shot in Cinéma vérité style by filmmaker Robert Drew, the film follows the adventures of George Moffat and Gleb Derujinsky as they vie for the title of US National Champion soaring pilot in 1969. While the film focuses primarily on the friendly rivalry between Moffat and Derujinsky, Moffat's truer nemesis in the film is Wally Scott, flying his Schleicher ASW 12.

In the film, Moffat and Derujinsky both fly Schempp-Hirth Cirrus sailplanes.

References

Gliding in the United States
1971 documentary films
American sports documentary films
1971 films
Documentary films about aviation
Films directed by Robert Drew
1970s American films